The 2018–19 New York Islanders season was the 47th season in the franchise's history. It was their fourth season in the Barclays Center in the New York City borough of Brooklyn, which they moved into after leaving Nassau Coliseum in Nassau County on Long Island at the conclusion of the 2014–15 season. The Islanders also used Nassau Coliseum as a part-time venue starting this year where they played half of their 41 regular season home games, and as well as all First Round playoff home games. The Islanders entered the season looking to improve on their 35–37–10 record from the previous season, as well as make the playoffs for the first time since the 2015–16 season. They were able to improve their performance, despite losing their longtime captain and franchise player John Tavares in free agency. The Islanders clinched a playoff spot on March 30, 2019, with a 5–1 win against the Buffalo Sabres. On April 16, the Islanders swept the Pittsburgh Penguins in the first round, making it their first playoff series sweep since the 1983 Stanley Cup playoffs. However, in the second round, the Islanders were not able to capitalize on their success against Pittsburgh, as they were swept by the Carolina Hurricanes.

Standings

Divisional standings

Conference standings

Schedule and results

Preseason
The preseason schedule was published on June 15, 2018.

Regular season
The regular season schedule was released on June 21, 2018.

Playoffs

The Islanders faced the Pittsburgh Penguins in the First Round of the playoffs, and swept the series in four games, marking the first time since the 1982–83 season that they swept the series.

The Islanders faced the Carolina Hurricanes in the Second Round of the playoffs, and were swept in four games.

Player statistics
As of May 3, 2019

Skaters

Goaltenders

Transactions
The Islanders have been involved in the following transactions during the 2018–19 season.

Trades

Free agents

Contract terminations

Signings

Draft picks

Below are the New York Islanders' selections at the 2018 NHL Entry Draft, which was held on June 22 and 23, 2018, at the American Airlines Center in Dallas, Texas.

Notes:
 The Calgary Flames' first-round pick went to the New York Islanders as the result of a trade on June 24, 2017, that sent Travis Hamonic and a conditional fourth-round pick in 2019 to Calgary in exchange for a second-round pick in 2018, a conditional second-round pick in 2019 and this pick.

References

New York Islanders seasons
New York Islanders
New York Islanders
New York Islanders
New York Islanders
2010s in Brooklyn
Prospect Heights, Brooklyn